The Clement Peerens Explosition, or CPeX, is a Belgian parody rock group, created by Hugo Matthysen, Bart Peeters and Ronny Mosuse.

History
During the early 1990s, Matthysen played the fictional character "Clement Peerens" on the comedy radio show Het Leugenpaleis and its televised successor, Het Peulengaleis. Peerens was portrayed as a self-proclaimed "pop expert", recounting ever-more outrageous anecdotes about current and past rock stars which were little more than drunken ramblings. As the character's popularity grew, it was decided to spin off an actual rock band, which began performing in 1994 and went on to release four albums. The last of these went on sale in 2000 and the band's performances became sporadic. In 2008, CPeX released a best-of album featuring some new material and began playing live again in a modified line-up, as Bart Peeters was forced to withdraw from the band for medical reasons. Aram Van Ballaert as Dave De Peuter/Lady Dave took his place as drummer. In 2011 the album Olraait was released. The band released the single Boormachien in 2014. In 2021 Peerens announced the band would stop performing in december 2022. What was planned to be one concert ended up in ten with 20.000 tickets sold. CPeX played their last ten farewell concerts in december 2022 ending on 7 January 2023 at De Roma in Antwerp.

Style

Many of CPeX's lyrics cover inconsequential subjects, often reflecting Peerens' macho, borderline-misogynistic world view and lack of any real interests; subjects include ownership of the TV remote, trying not to answer questions about fashion, or the poor quality of cheap wine.

Controversy

In 1995, the band released the album Foorwijf!. The title track caused a minor controversy, as some funfair operators believed they were being put in an unfairly negative light.

Discography

References

External links
 Official website, contains a free download of the latest single

Belgian rock music groups
Belgian comedy musicians
Parody musicians
Belgian parodists